Roger Planchon (born 12 September 1931 in Saint-Chamond, Loire, died on 12 May 2009 in Paris), was a French playwright, director, and filmmaker.

Biography
Roger Planchon spent his childhood in the Ardèche, notably in Dornas. He found its inspiration from his rural origins and this issue was a recurring theme in his writings.

He started on stage in 1949 after winning an amateur theater. In 1952, he founded the Théâtre de la Comédie, located in the rue des Marronniers, in Lyon. He was the director of the Théâtre de la Cité of Villeurbanne since 1957 (which became the Théâtre National Populaire in 1972).

Roger Planchon transposed many works by Brecht, Molière, Shakespeare, and many works of contemporary authors, including Arthur Adamov and Michel Vinaver, but also opened the Théâtre National Populaire to Patrice Chéreau, then Georges Lavaudant.

As films, he directed George Dandin ou le Mari confondu by Molière, Louis, enfant roi, which was entered at Cannes, and another one by Lautrec.

End of life
In 2002, Christian Schiaretti succeeded him as director of the TNP; he created his own company with which he continued to write and direct until his death.

He died on 12 May 2009 after a heart attack, he is buried in the Père Lachaise Cemetery (22nd division).

Filmography

References

External links
 Roger Planchon - Daily Telegraph obituary

1931 births
2009 deaths
People from Saint-Chamond
French film directors
French theatre directors
Burials at Père Lachaise Cemetery